A bushranger was a lawbreaker who used the Australian bush to avoid capture.

Bushranger(s) may also refer to:

 Bush Ranger (car), limited production off-road vehicle based on a Range Rover platform
 Bushranger (American horse) (1930–37), American racehorse
 Bushranger (Irish horse) (born 2006), Irish racehorse
 Bushranger, popular nickname given to the Australian Bell UH-1 Iroquois helicopters during the Vietnam War
 Bushranger, the Norinco JW-103 rifle
 Bushrangers, Australian rules football team in the AFLQ State Association
 North East Bushrangers, Australian basketball team
 Victorian Bushrangers, Australian cricket team

See also
 Bush Pioneer, financial supporter of George W. Bush
 The Bushranger (disambiguation)